This is a list of Lepidoptera (butterflies and moths) observed in the U.S. state of Utah.

Achemon sphinx moth (Eumorpha achemon)
American painted lady butterfly (Vanessa virginiensis)
American snout butterfly (Libytheana carinenta)
Anise swallowtail butterfly (Papilio zelicaon)
Aphrodite fritillary butterfly (Speyeria aphrodite)
Arctic fritillary butterfly (Boloria chariclea)
Army cutworm (Euxoa auxiliaris)
Black cutworm (Agrotis ipsilon)
Black swallowtail butterfly (Papilio polyxenes)
Bordered patch butterfly (Chlosyne lacinia)
Cabbage looper (Trichoplusia ni)
California patch butterfly (Chlosyne californica)
California sister butterfly (Adelpha californica)
California tortoiseshell butterfly (Nymphalis californica)
Callippe fritillary butterfly (Speyeria callippe)
Clodius parnassian butterfly (Parnassius clodius)
Common buckeye butterfly (Junonia coenia)
Compton tortoiseshell butterfly (Nymphalis vaualbum)
Corn earworm (Helicoverpa zea) - also called the tomato fruitworm
Coronis fritillary butterfly (Speyeria coronis)
Diamondback moth (Plutella xylostella)
Dotted checkerspot butterfly (Poladryas minuta)
Edith's checkerspot butterfly (Euphydryas editha)
Edward's fritillary butterfly (Speyeria edwardsii)
Empress Leilia butterfly (Asterocampa leilia)
Fall armyworm (Spodoptera frugiperda)
Field crescent butterfly (Phyciodes pulchella)
Five-spotted hawkmoth (Manduca quinquemaculata)
Freija fritillary butterfly (Boloria freija)
Fulvia checkerspot butterfly (Thessalia fulvia)
Glassy cutworm (Crymodes devastator)
Gorgone checkerspot butterfly (Chlosyne gorgone)
Gray comma butterfly (Polygonia progne)
Great Basin fritillary butterfly (Speyeria egleis)
Great spangled fritillary butterfly (Speyeria cybele)
Green comma butterfly (Polygonia faunus)
Gulf fritillary butterfly (Agraulis vanillae)
Hackberry emperor butterfly (Asterocampa celtis)
Hoary comma butterfly (Polygonia gracilis)
Hydaspe fritillary butterfly (Speyeria hydaspe)
Indra swallowtail butterfly (Papilio indra)
Leanira checkerspot butterfly (Chlosyne leanira)
Lorquin's admiral butterfly (Limenitis lorquini)
Milbert's tortoiseshell butterfly (Aglais milberti)
Monarch butterfly (Danaus plexippus)
Mormon fritillary butterfly (Speyeria mormonia)
Mourning cloak butterfly (Nymphalis antiopa)
Mylitta crescent butterfly (Phyciodes mylitta)
Nokomis fritillary butterfly (Speyeria nokomis)
Northern checkerspot butterfly (Chlosyne palla)
Northern crescent butterfly (Phyciodes cocyta)
Northwestern fritillary butterfly (Speyeria hesperis)
Old World swallowtail butterfly (Papilio machaon)
Painted lady butterfly (Vanessa cardui)
Pale crescent butterfly (Phyciodes pallida)
Pale swallowtail butterfly (Papilio eurymedon)
Pale Western cutworm (Agrotis orthogonia)
Pallid crescentspot butterfly (Phyciodes picta)
Pearl crescent butterfly (Phyciodes tharos)
Pipevine swallowtail butterfly (Battus philenor)
Queen butterfly (Danaus gilippus)
Red admiral butterfly (Vanessa atalanta)
Red-spotted purple butterfly (Limenitis arthemis astyanax)
Relict fritillary butterfly (Boloria kriemhild)
Rockslide checkerspot butterfly (Chlosyne whitneyi)
Rocky Mountain parnassian butterfly (Parnassius smintheus)
Silver-bordered fritillary butterfly (Boloria selene)
Small white butterfly (Pieris rapae)
Soldier butterfly (Danaus eresimus)
Tropical buckeye butterfly (Junonia genoveva)
Two-tailed swallowtail butterfly (Papilio multicaudata)
Variable checkerspot butterfly (Euphydryas chalcedona)
Variegated cutworm (Peridroma saucia)
Variegated fritillary butterfly (Euptoieta claudia)
Viceroy butterfly (Limenitis archippus)
Weidemeyer's admiral butterfly (Limenitis weidemeyerii)
West Coast lady butterfly (Vanessa annabella)
Western bean cutworm (Striacosta albicosta)
Western tiger swallowtail butterfly (Papilio rutulus)
White admiral butterfly (Limenitis arthemis)
White peacock butterfly (Anartia jatrophae)
White-lined sphinx moth (Hyles lineata)
Zerene fritillary butterfly (Speyeria zerene)

References

Butterflies and moths
Utah